The Tweddle Farmstead is a Registered Historic Place located on Beaverdam Road in the Town of Montgomery in Orange County, New York.  Built in the early 19th century by Bercoon van Alst, it was added to significantly in the 1830s in the Greek Revival style. This gave the house its current front. Thomas Tweddle bought the house in 1868, and it has remained in his family since.

It was added to the National Register of Historic Places in 1999.

References

Houses on the National Register of Historic Places in New York (state)
Houses in Orange County, New York
National Register of Historic Places in Orange County, New York
Greek Revival houses in New York (state)